The 12th Port of Embarkation, later designated 377th Theater Sustainment Command, was constituted on 2 July 1942 and was activated 5 July 1942 at Fort Dix, New Jersey. The unit was converted, reorganized, and redesignated 7 November 1942 as the 12th Port. The unit was inactivated 4 January 1946 at Camp Kilmer, New Jersey and later redesignated 3 November 1948 in New Orleans, Louisiana, as the 377th Transportation Major Port.  On 11 September 1950 the 377th was called to Camp Kilmer, New Jersey. Later, the unit moved to Fort Eustis, Virginia and stayed on active Federal Service until 10 October 1952.  From 1953 until 1963, the 377th remained in a Reserve status and experienced several changes in unit designation.

On 31 December 1965, the unit was re-designated as the 377th Support Brigade under the Army Logistical Concept.  On 16 October 1979, it was renamed the 377th Corps Support Command. It retained the designation until 16 July 1981 when it was designated as a Theater Army Area Command (TAACOM).  On 1 October 1998 the TAACOM wartime mission expanded and the unit designation was changed to the 377th Theater Support Command.

The TSC serves as a Force Support Package unit with an ongoing support mission in its area of operation. Over 500 downtrace units throughout the United States, Puerto Rico, Guam and the Virgin Islands provide support to the TSC for training and wartime mission guidance. Whether at home station, deployed across the country or overseas, the TSC trains to achieve its peacetime and wartime mission of providing command and control of assigned units to ensure and maintain a high state of readiness. The TSC prepares wartime-aligned units to accomplish their mission by developing, executing and evaluating training. The TSC provides daily logistics support to its wartime higher headquarters for missions and exercises.

Subordinate units 

As of 2022 the following units are subordinated to the 377th Theater Sustainment Command:

4th Sustainment Command (Expeditionary), in  San Antonio, Texas

 90th Sustainment Brigade, in Little Rock, Arkansas
 211th Regional Support Group
 300th Sustainment Brigade, in Grand Prairie, Texas 
 77th Quartermaster Group (Petroleum)

 143rd Sustainment Command (Expeditionary), in Orlando, Florida
 321st Sustainment Brigade, in Baton Rouge, Louisiana
 518th Sustainment Brigade, in Knightdale, North Carolina
 207th Regional Support Group, in Fort Jackson, South Carolina
 641st Regional Support Group, in St. Petersburg, Florida
 642nd Regional Support Group, in Decatur, Georgia
  310th Sustainment Command (Expeditionary), in Indianapolis, Indiana
 55th Sustainment Brigade, in Fort Belvoir, Virginia
 38th Regional Support Group, in Charleston, West Virginia
 643rd Regional Support Group, in Whitehall, Ohio
 354th Quartermaster Group in Whitehall, Ohio
 316th Sustainment Command (Expeditionary), in Coraopolis, Pennsylvania
 77th Sustainment Brigade, in Joint Base McGuire-Dix-Lakehurst, New Jersey
 301st Regional Support Group, in Butler, Pennsylvania
 475th Quartermaster Group, in Farrell, Pennsylvania
 655th Regional Support Group, in Chicopee, Massachusetts
 3rd Transportation Brigade (Expeditionary), in Fort Belvoir, Virginia
 Army Reserve Sustainment Command, in Birmingham, Alabama
 Deployment Support Command, in Birmingham, Alabama
 1179th Transportation Brigade, in Fort Hamilton, New York
 1173rd Transportation Battalion, in Brockton, Massachusetts
 1174th Transportation Battalion, in Fort Totten, New York
 1185th Transportation Battalion, in Lancaster, Pennsylvania
 1398th Transportation Battalion, in Baltimore, Maryland
 1189th Transportation Brigade, in North Charleston, South Carolina
 1182nd Transportation Battalion, in North Charleston, South Carolina
 1186th Transportation Battalion, in Jacksonville, Florida
 1188th Transportation Battalion, in Decatur, Georgia
 1190th Transportation Brigade, in Baton Rouge, Louisiana
 1181st Transportation Battalion, in Meridian, Mississippi
 1184th Transportation Battalion, in Mobile, Alabama
 1192nd Transportation Battalion, in New Orleans, Louisiana
 1394th Transportation Brigade, in Camp Pendleton, California
 1395th Transportation Battalion, in Joint Base Lewis–McChord, Washington
 1397th Transportation Battalion, in Vallejo, California
 757th Transportation Battalion (Railway Operations), in Milwaukee, Wisconsin

References

Military units and formations established in 1948
Theater 377
Military units and formations of the United States Army Reserve